FT or ft may refer to:

Arts, entertainment, and media
 Fairy Tail, a manga and anime
 Featuring (ft.), used when crediting a secondary artist on a musical recording
 Fighting Talk, a British radio show
 Financial Times, a newspaper specialising in UK and international business and financial news
 First Things, a conservative religious journal based in New York 
 Fuzzy Tomato, a fictional character in Attack of the Killer Tomatoes: The Animated Series and its sequels

Businesses and organizations
 Faculdade de Tecnologia da Universidade Estadual de Campinas (School of Technology at the State University of Campinas)
 Foundation trusts, semi-autonomous organisational units within the National Health Service in England
 France Télécom, a French telecommunications company, now called Orange S.A.
 Føroya Tele, the public telecommunications company in the Faroe Islands.

Science and technology
 Foot (unit) (ft.), a unit of distance or length

Computing
 .ft, the filename extension of Lotus Notes full type indexes
 FaceTime, a video chat feature on Apple devices
 Fault Tolerance, the property that enables a system to continue operating properly in the event of the failure of some of its components

Vehicles
 EMD FT, an American diesel-electric railway locomotive
 Northrop XFT, an American 1930s fighter aircraft
 Renault FT, a tank used in the First World War

Other uses in science and technology
 Failure tree, in safety engineering and reliability engineering analysis
 Fischer–Tropsch process, chemical reactions that converts carbon monoxide and hydrogen into fuel oil
 Fourier transform, in signal processing, which transforms a function between time and frequency domains
 Fluctuation theorem, in physics relates to the probability distribution of the time-averaged irreversible entropy production
 Franke and Taylor, two digital modes in radio communication: FT8 and is derivative FT4.
 Impulse (physics), the product of force and time (Ft)

Other uses
 Fair trade, a social movement promoting improved trading conditions and sustainability
 FasTrak, abbreviated to FT on the transponder and company logo
 Final Testament, in the Quran
 Fire control technician, a United States Navy occupational rating
 Fischertechnik, a brand of construction toy
 Fort, a fortified place, especially in place names
 Freight ton, in shipping
 Full time, the end of a regulation association football match
 Hungarian forint (Ft), the currency of Hungary